Kondrovo is a town and the administrative center of Dzerzhinsky District in Kaluga Oblast, Russia, located on the Shanya River (a tributary of the Ugra in the Oka's basin),  northwest of Kaluga, the administrative center of the oblast. Population:

History
Originally known as Kondyrevo, it was a votchina of Dmitry Kondyrin, a Russian voyevoda who was granted these lands for his service during the second war with the Grand Duchy of Lithuania in 1500–1501. The settlement's name gradually changed to Kondrovo by the 1840s.

In 1790, a paper mill was built in the village, and by the end of the 19th century it became famous for its high quality paper.

Town status was granted to Kondrovo in 1938.

During World War II, Kondrovo was occupied by the German Army from October 9, 1941 to January 19, 1942.

Administrative and municipal status
Within the framework of administrative divisions, Kondrovo serves as the administrative center of Dzerzhinsky District, to which it is directly subordinated. As a municipal division, the town of Kondrovo is incorporated within Dzerzhinsky Municipal District as Kondrovo Urban Settlement.

Economy

The town's paper mill KBK (Kodrovskaya Bumazhnaya Kompaniya) is still the main industrial enterprise. It produces parchment, notebooks, toilet paper, and female hygiene articles.

References

Notes

Sources

External links

MojGorod.ru. Entry on Kondrovo 

Cities and towns in Kaluga Oblast
Medynsky Uyezd